Parowan is a city in and the county seat of Iron County, Utah, United States. The population was 2,790 at the 2010 census, and in 2018 the estimated population was 3,100.

Parowan became the first incorporated city in Iron County in 1851. A fort that had been constructed on the east side of Center Creek the previous year was an initial hub in the development of ironworks in the region. Parowan served as the agricultural support base for the local iron industry, whose blast furnace was located in nearby Cedar City. Eventually, the ironworks were decommissioned.

Despite occasional successes, the mission failed to produce a consistent and sustained supply of pig iron. By 1858, most of the area's mining operations had ceased due to disappointing yields. Today, the area's chief industries are recreation and tourism.

History
Fremont culture and Anasazi people were the first known inhabitants of Parowan. Petroglyphs, pithouses, arrowheads, pottery, and manos dating from A.D. 750 to 1250 found in the area are evidence that it was on a major thoroughfare of early indigenous peoples. Located near the Parowan Gap there are dinosaur tracks. East of the Gap and petroglyphs hikers can discover Hadrosaurs tracks that were originally formed in non-resistant mudstone. The tracks have three toes and can be found on the side of 12800 N.  Later, the Old Spanish Trail passed through the area.

Parowan was founded on January 13, 1851, twelve months after Parley P. Pratt and members of his exploring party discovered the Little Salt Lake Valley and nearby deposits of iron ore in the Iron Mountain District. On January 8, 1850, Pratt had raised a liberty pole at Heap's Spring and dedicated the site as "The City of Little Salt Lake". Based on Pratt's exploration report, Brigham Young called for the establishment of settlements in the area to produce much-needed iron implements for the pioneer state.

Mormon apostle George A. Smith was appointed to head the establishment of this "Iron Mission" in 1850. The first company of 120 men, 31 women, and 18 children braved winter weather traveling south from Provo during December. They sometimes built roads and bridges as they traveled, and they finally reached Center Creek on January 13, 1851. After enduring two bitterly cold nights, they moved across the creek and circled their wagons by Heap's Spring and Pratt's liberty pole, seeking the protection of the hills. Within days, the settlement organization was completed: companies of men were dispatched to build a road up the canyon, a town site was surveyed and laid into lots, and a fort and a log council house were begun. The council house was used as church, schoolhouse, theater, and community recreation center for many years.

In 1861 construction was begun on a large church building to stand in the center of the public square. The pioneers envisioned a building of three stories, built from the abundant yellow sandstone and massive timbers in nearby canyons. Known as the "Old Rock Church", the building was completed in 1867 and served as a place of worship, town council hall, school building, social hall, and tourist camp. In 1939 it was restored through the efforts of the Daughters of Utah Pioneers and a Parowan-sponsored WPA project. It is now a museum of Parowan's early history.

Parowan has been called the "Mother Town of the Southwest" because of the many pioneers who left from there to start other communities in southern Utah, Nevada, Arizona, Colorado, and even Oregon and Wyoming. In its first year, colonists were asked to settle Johnson Fort, now Enoch, where a stockade was built, and were also sent to settle along Coal Creek, site of the settlement to manufacture iron which became Cedar City.

Parowan's first settlers were instructed to plant crops so that following immigrants could open up the coal and iron ore deposits, but local industries were also developed. Self-sufficiency was envisioned, and local industries included a tannery, sawmill, cotton mill, and factories for making saddles and harnesses, furniture and cabinets, shoes, and guns; there also were carpentry and blacksmith shops. In the early 1900s sheep and dairy industries were well established. Local farms were noted for their quality Rambouillet sheep, and the Southern Utah Dairy Company, a cooperative venture begun in 1900, produced dairy products and was known for its "Pardale Cheese".

The first attempts at iron manufacturing were unsuccessful, but mining in the twentieth century brought prosperity to Iron County. When the closure of the mines and the completion of Interstate 15 threatened economic depression in the early 1980s, Parowan citizens developed an economic plan to keep the community viable.

Significant growth has occurred in the 1990s in Parowan; it has been attributed to affordable utility fees and a positive economic climate. Parowan is the site of the annual Iron County Fair on Labor Day weekend; it also is a host community for the Utah Summer Games and sponsor of the annual "Christmas in the Country" celebration each November.

In 1993 the city began development of Heritage Park. This site includes a park, a grotto and pond, and statues commemorating the founders of Parowan. Other local historic sites include the original town square with the Old Rock Church, the War Memorial and Rose Garden, the Third/Fourth Ward LDS chapel built in 1915, and the Jesse N. Smith Home Museum. Parowan City supports the Parowan Community Theatre, which produces theatrical productions throughout the year.

Geography

Parowan sits on the southeastern edge of Parowan Valley, at the mouth of Parowan Canyon. A distinct red-top mountain known as Valentine Peak overlooks the valley and is used as a common landmark for the city.

Interstate 15 runs along the northwestern edge of the city, with access from Exits 75 and 78. I-15 leads north  to Cove Fort and Interstate 70, and southwest  to Cedar City. Utah State Route 143 leads south up Parowan Canyon  to Cedar Breaks National Monument.

Climate 
Parowan has a cold semi-arid climate (Köppen BSk). The data below are from the Western Regional Climate Center for the period from 1893 to 2010.

Demographics

As of the census of 2000, there were 2,565 people, 893 households, and 682 families residing in the city. The population density was 439.2 people per square mile (169.6/km2). There were 1,230 housing units at an average density of 210.6 per square mile (81.3/km2). The racial makeup of the city was 96.41% White, 0.39% Native American, 0.12% Asian, 0.16% Pacific Islander, 1.79% from other races, and 1.13% from two or more races. Hispanic or Latino of any race were 3.16% of the population.

There were 893 households, out of which 37.2% had children under the age of 18 living with them, 65.6% were married couples living together, 6.9% had a female householder with no husband present, and 23.6% were non-families. 21.3% of all households were made up of individuals, and 11.6% had someone living alone who was 65 years of age or older. The average household size was 2.84 and the average family size was 3.33.

In the city, the population was spread out, with 31.2% under the age of 18, 8.5% from 18 to 24, 21.9% from 25 to 44, 20.3% from 45 to 64, and 18.2% who were 65 years of age or older. The median age was 36 years. For every 100 females, there were 98.1 males. For every 100 females age 18 and over, there were 92.0 males.

The median income for a household in the city was $32,426, and the median income for a family was $36,548. Males had a median income of $30,170 versus $17,036 for females. The per capita income for the city was $14,859. About 7.8% of families and 11.0% of the population were below the poverty line, including 15.4% of those under age 18 and 5.2% of those age 65 or over.

Notable people
Texas Rose Bascom (1922-1993), rodeo trick rider and fancy trick roper, Hollywood actress, hall of fame inductee
Jesse N. Smith - Mormon pioneer and colonizer who helped settle Parowan. Smith served as mayor of Parowan from 1859 to 1860.
Scott M. Matheson - Governor of Utah from 1977 to 1985.
 Alma Richards - Utah's first Olympic gold medalist. Richards grew up in Parowan and went on to win the high jump in the 1912 Olympic Games in Stockholm. His last request was to be buried in his hometown, where his remains reside in the Parowan cemetery. Parowan High School's track and football stadium is named Alma Richards Stadium.

References

External links
 City of Parowan official website
 Parowan history
 Diary of Edson Whipple

 
1851 establishments in Utah Territory
Populated places established in 1851
Cities in Iron County, Utah
Cities in Utah
County seats in Utah